Eli Babalj (born 21 February 1992) is an Australian footballer who plays as a striker. Alongside Robert Cornthwaite and Sasa Ognenovski, Babalj, at 1.95 m is the joint third tallest player to have represented the Australia national association football team, behind Zeljko Kalac (2.02 m) and Harry Souttar (1.98 m).

Club career
Born in Sarajevo, SFR Yugoslavia, Babalj has spent the majority of his life in Australia and started off playing with Perth SC. In 2008, he was signed by Perth Glory for their Youth League team. However, he was signed by the AIS for the 2009–10 season in which the AIS came last, however Babalj managed to find the net 9 times.

Melbourne Heart
On 26 December it was announced that A-League expansion club Melbourne Heart had signed the then 17-year-old for their inaugural A-League 2010–11 season. He made his debut for the club in a friendly against Geelong All Stars XI and also scored his first goal in that match. He also took part in the friendly against Everton FC in which Heart lost 2–0. He made his debut for Melbourne Heart in the opening round of the 2010–11 A-League season against Central Coast Mariners at AAMI Park. During May 2012 it was announced that Serbian side Red Star Belgrade was scouting him.

Red Star Belgrade
On 7 June 2012 it was announced he had signed with Serbian Superliga contender Red Star Belgrade. He made his debut on 31 August 2012, against Bordeaux in the 2012–13 UEFA Europa League play-off round. He scored his first goal on his league debut against FK Smederevo on 29 September 2012.

Melbourne Heart
Eli Babalj made his return appearance to the A-League for the Melbourne Heart away to the Western Sydney Wanderers on Australia Day, 26 January 2013 as a 2nd half substitution.

AZ
On 19 April 2013, Dutch club AZ Alkmaar completed the signing of Eli for a fee believed to be in the region of $200,000.

Loan to PEC Zwolle
On 2 February 2015, Babalj was sent on loan at PEC Zwolle for the rest of the season.
Eli Babalj made his Eredivisie debut for PEC Zwolle at home to the Go Ahead Eagles on 15 February 2015 as a 70th-minute substitute for Maikel van der Werff.

Loan to Adelaide United
On 24 July 2015, Alkmaar confirmed that they would allow Babalj to go out on loan back to Australia to Adelaide United for the 2015–16 A-League season. This would be Guillermo Amor's first signing for Adelaide as the new manager. Babalj made his debut for Adelaide United as a substitute in the 2015 FFA Cup in Darwin against Darwin Olympic. He also scored his first goal to help Adelaide to a 6–1 win.

On 22 January 2016, Babalj ruptured his anterior cruciate ligament against Brisbane Roar, ruling him out for the remainder of the A-League season.

Adelaide United
On 7 February 2017, after training with Adelaide United since late January, Babalj joined Adelaide United once more until the end of the season.

Mladá Boleslav
On 7 August 2017, Babalj signed with Czech club Mladá Boleslav.

ATK 
Babalj signed with Indian Super League club ATK for the 2018–19 season. He made his first appearance on 28 November 2018 against FC Goa, coming on as a substitute in the 68th minute. The match ended 0–0.

Newcastle Jets

On 12 October 2021, after stint's with Brisbane Roar and Chainat Hornbill Babalj returned to Australia and signed with Newcastle Jets for the 2021-22 A-League Men season after a successful trial at the club.

International career
He has represented Australia at U-20 level during the 2010 AFC U-19 Championship qualification for the 2010 AFC U-19 Championship. He played in 4 qualification games, scoring 3 goals, against Singapore, and two against Chinese Taipei.
Babalj also represented Australia at the AFF U-19 Youth Championship. He scored against Vietnam and the winning goal in the final of the AFF U-19 Youth Championship against Thailand. He made his debut for Australia's senior team on 14 November 2012 in a friendly against South Korea. Babalj was selected in the Socceroo's squad for the East Asian Cup qualification round. He started his first game for Australia against Guam in a 9–0 win, scoring a double before being substituted.

International goals

Career statistics

Honours

Club 

 Adelaide United
 A-League Premiers: 2015–16
 A-League Championship: 2015–16

Country 

Australia
 AFC U-19 Championship: 2010 (runners-up)
 AFF U-19 Youth Championship: 2010

References

External links
 Voetbal International profile 

1992 births
Living people
Footballers from Sarajevo
Australian soccer players
Australia international soccer players
Association football forwards
Melbourne City FC players
Red Star Belgrade footballers
AZ Alkmaar players
PEC Zwolle players
Adelaide United FC players
FK Mladá Boleslav players
Brisbane Roar FC players
A-League Men players
Czech First League players
Eredivisie players
Indian Super League players
ATK (football club) players
Newcastle Jets FC players
Expatriate footballers in Serbia
Expatriate footballers in the Netherlands
Expatriate footballers in India
Australian people of Bosnia and Herzegovina descent
Australian people of Serbian descent
Bosnia and Herzegovina emigrants to Australia
Australian Institute of Sport soccer players
Yugoslav Wars refugees
Soccer players from Perth, Western Australia
Expatriate footballers in the Czech Republic
Australian expatriate sportspeople in the Czech Republic
Australian expatriate sportspeople in the Netherlands
Australian expatriate sportspeople in India
Australian expatriate sportspeople in Serbia
Australian expatriate soccer players